Washington Park is a neighborhood in east central Seattle, Washington, named after the city park to its northwest. It is bounded on the east by 38th and 37th Avenues E. and Hillside Drive E., beyond which are Madison Park and Denny-Blaine; on the south by Lake Washington Boulevard, beyond which is Denny-Blaine and Madison Valley; on the west by Washington Park, and on the north by the private Broadmoor community and golf club. Washington Park is home to many historic homes including one from 1907 that houses the current President of the University of Washington. This house is situated on  looking over Lake Washington and has grounds rivaled by few homes in the city. The house and land was donated to the University with the clause that it must be occupied by the President of U.W.

The neighborhood's main thoroughfares are E. Madison Street (northeast- and southwest-bound) and Lake Washington Boulevard E. (northwest- and southeast-bound).

Neighborhoods in Seattle